Espen Thorstenson (27 November 1940 – 15 January 2019) was a Norwegian film director.

Career
Thorstenson was educated at the Institut des hautes études cinématographiques in Paris.

He died on 15 January 2019, aged 78.

References

1940 births
2019 deaths
Norwegian film directors